The first season of Alias premiered September 30, 2001 on ABC and concluded May 12, 2002 and was released on DVD in region 1 on September 2, 2003. Guest stars in season one include Sir Roger Moore, Terry O'Quinn, Quentin Tarantino, and Gina Torres.

Apart from "Truth Be Told", the episodes of Alias are often unconventionally structured in that the title credits are usually shown well into the plot, almost as an afterthought. Also, usually a plot finishes at mid-episode and a new plot begins, so that every episode finishes with a cliffhanger. The impression thus created is that an episode will conclude the previous one and plant the seeds of the next one.

Main characters

Cast
Main characters
 Jennifer Garner as Sydney Bristow (22 episodes)
 Ron Rifkin as Arvin Sloane (22 episodes)
 Michael Vartan as Michael Vaughn (22 episodes)
Bradley Cooper as Will Tippin (22 episodes)
 Merrin Dungey as Francie Calfo (20 episodes)
 Carl Lumbly as Marcus Dixon (19 episodes)
 Kevin Weisman as Marshall Flinkman (21 episodes)
 Victor Garber as Jack Bristow (22 episodes)

Recurring characters

Episodes

Home release
The 6-DVD box set of Season 1 was released in region 1 format (US) on September 2, 2003, in region 2 format (UK) on September 29, 2003 and in region 4 format (AU) on November 4, 2003. The DVDs contain all episodes of Season 1, plus the following features:
 Audio commentaries on select episodes
 Deleted Scenes
 Pilot production diary
 Featurette: A Mission Around The World
 Marshall Flinkman's Gadget Gallery
 Auditions
 Season Two Preview
 Season Three Preview
 PS2 game sneak peek
 Gag reel

References

External links

 

2001 American television seasons
2002 American television seasons
Alias (TV series) seasons